Činč is a Serbian band that Đorđe Ilić and Luka Stanisavljević formed in 2001. Before that, the duo performed for several years under the name Čudan Šimijev Bend. In 2003 and in 2004, respectively, Irena Vanić and Srđan Stojanović joined the band. Činč's notable features are weird lyrics, sophisticated melodies and peculiar scene acting. The band performs at cultural centers, libraries, galleries, radio stations and Belgrade's botanical garden. Činč’s collaborations includes artists like Yoshio Machida, Marko Brecelj (ex-Buldožer), Saša Marković Mikrob, and strip-workshop Šlic.

Discography

Studio albums
Osečev sjaj (Škart, 2001, reissue Amorfon, 2004)
Ponašanje (Templum, 2003, reissue Listen Loudest, 2007)
Polyphonic Poetry (Amorfon, 2006)
Kalendář (independent web release, cincplug.com 2011)

Various artists compilations
Music for Baby (Amorfon, 2004)
11. bombardiranje Njujorka (Listen Loudest, 2007)
Šta treba maloj deci (Kornet, 2007)

Band members 
Luka Stanisavljević — bass guitar, guitar, vocals, Matrix decoder
Đorđe Ilić — guitar, vocals, percussions
Irena Vanić — vocals
Srđan Stojanović — violin, vocals

References

External links 

Official website
MySpace presentation
MySpace video presentation

Serbian rock music groups
Musical groups established in 2001
Serbian alternative rock groups
Serbian post-rock groups
Serbian indie rock groups